Kašina is a settlement in the City of Zagreb, Croatia, population 1,548 (2011 census). It is located around 22 km north-east of the city centre of Zagreb and north of the district Sesvete.

The first mention of Kašina is dated to 1217 in the charter of King Andrew II. The church in Kašina was badly damaged in the 1880 Zagreb earthquake. The settlement lies on a Medvednica fault and was also near the epicenter of the 2020 Zagreb earthquake.

References

Populated places in the City of Zagreb